John H. Ewing (October 16, 1918 – May 31, 2012) was an American Republican Party politician who served in both houses of the New Jersey Legislature: in the General Assembly from 1968 to 1977 and in the State Senate from 1978 to 1998, representing the 16th Legislative District.

Biography
Ewing attended Trinity College, but dropped out after two years. He served in the United States Army from 1940 to 1946 and again from 1951 to 1952, attaining the rank of first lieutenant and earning the Bronze Star Medal for his World War II service in New Guinea and the Philippines. He went into state politics after retiring as chairman of the board of Abercrombie & Fitch in 1967.

He served on the Somerset County Board of Chosen Freeholders in 1966 and 1967. He was active in the New Jersey Republican Party, serving as a delegate to the 1964 Republican National Convention, as a member of the Republican State Executive Committee from 1964 to 1968, and two terms as chair of the Republican State Finance Committee from 1965 to 1969 and from 1975 to 1978.

Ewing was elected to the New Jersey General Assembly in 1967, and served there until 1978, when he was elected to fill the seat that had been occupied by Raymond Bateman, who ran that year, and lost, in a bid for Governor of New Jersey. He served in the Senate as Assistant Minority Whip in 1980 and as President Pro Tempore in 1992 and 1993. He was a longtime chair of the Education Committee, Chair of the Joint Committee on Public Schools, and a member of the Women's Issues, Children and Family Services Committee, the Budget and Appropriations Committee and the Joint Budget Oversight Committee.

As chair of the Senate's Education Committee, Ewing played a major role in shaping the state's education system, where he supported charter schools, prison education and the 1994 disestablishment of the New Jersey Department of Higher Education. He also supported state takeovers of mismanaged school districts, pushing for a seizure of the Newark Public Schools in 1995. Ewing opposed state funding for economically disadvantaged schools and felt that there was no reason that richer districts could not be better supported than poorer ones, noting that "Some people drive a Mercedes; some drive a Ford Taurus, like me", but "[w]e can't pay for everyone to drive a Mercedes".

In 1996 his wife, Allison Ewing then age 76, was involved in what was determined the accidental death of a friend, Peggy Pulleyn, age 85. Pulleyn was walking down a road in Bedminster. Ewing had driven past Pulleyn and stopped, backing up the vehicle to speak with her. In the process, she backed over Pulleyn, resulting in her death.

Ewing chose not to run for re-election in 1997 after 30 years in the legislature. He was replaced in the Senate by Walter J. Kavanaugh, with Peter J. Biondi elected to Kavanaugh's former seat in the Assembly. Ewing remarked that "Dear Walter [Kavanaugh] has been waiting and waiting to take my place... he keeps threatening to push me in front of a bus".

Ewing had been a resident of Bedminster, New Jersey. He died at the age of 93 on May 31, 2012, in Northfield, Vermont.

References

External links

|-

|-

1918 births
2012 deaths
United States Army personnel of World War II
United States Army personnel of the Korean War
Businesspeople from New Jersey
County commissioners in New Jersey
Republican Party members of the New Jersey General Assembly
Republican Party New Jersey state senators
People from Bedminster, New Jersey
Politicians from Somerset County, New Jersey
United States Army officers
20th-century American businesspeople
Military personnel from New Jersey